Seydou Diarra (born 16 April 1968) is an Ivorian former footballer who played as a goalkeeper. He played in 12 matches for the Ivory Coast national team from 1996 to 1999. He was also named in Ivory Coast's squad for the 1998 African Cup of Nations tournament.

References

External links
 

1968 births
Living people
Ivorian footballers
Association football goalkeepers
Ivory Coast international footballers
1998 African Cup of Nations players
Place of birth missing (living people)